Titanoides is an extinct genus of pantodont mammal that lived in North Dakota and as far north as central Alberta. They had a bear-like appearance with huge canines, short limbs and five clawed digits; however, they were herbivores and probably had traits and attributes more similar to diprotodontids.

References

External links
 "Ferae Past and Present (Phylogenetic tree)" at Okapiland

Pantodonts
Paleocene mammals
Clawed herbivores
Cenozoic mammals of North America
Fossil taxa described in 1917
Prehistoric mammal genera